Eyshum may refer to:
 Eyshum, Lamerd
 Eyshum 1, Shiraz County
 Eyshum 2, Shiraz County